Beyerdynamic GmbH & Co. KG (stylized as beyerdynamic) is a German manufacturer of microphones, headphones, wireless audio systems, and conference systems. Headquartered in Heilbronn, Germany, Beyerdynamic has been family-owned since its founding in 1924.

History
In the 1920s in Berlin, founder Eugen Beyer believed that cinema presented a new opportunity in communication media. The first products he produced were loudspeakers for film palaces in 1924. At the end of the 1930s, Beyer developed the first pair of dynamic headphones, the DT 48. World War II temporarily froze production; however, in 1948, Beyerdynamic sought new beginnings in Heilbronn. The "Stielhörer" DT 49 became a popular item of "Plattenbars" (record-bars) in the 1950s.

Beyerdynamic developed the highly directional ribbon microphone Beyerdynamic M 160 model in 1957, along with the figure-8 pattern M 130. These microphones contained dual ribbon aluminum elements suspended between neodymium magnets. The M 160 went on to become a classic recording studio microphone, still in production after more than six decades. The "transistophone", the company's first wireless microphone, went into production in 1962.  The Beatles' 1966 German tour used the E-1000 microphone.  Elton John, ABBA, and Stevie Wonder all sang into sound transformers produced by Beyerdynamic.  In 1985, Beyerdynamic acquired its then-North American distributor, Burns Audiotronics, which became its North American subsidiary. Today Beyerdynamic, Inc. have their own office headquartered in Farmingdale, New York.

At the 1988 Olympic Games in Seoul all media reporting sites were equipped with headsets from Beyerdynamic.  In 1999, the new Bundestag in Berlin was fitted with Beyerdynamic's digital microphones.  The reporters from the Football World Cup in Germany used the DT 297 headset.  Most recently, the TG1000 digital wireless system has been introduced.

Products

  Headphones – hifi headphones, in-ear headphones, mobile headphones, headphones for studio and stage, headphone amplifiers, accessories
  Headsets – aviation headsets, gaming and multimedia headsets, intercom and broadcast headsets, accessories
 Microphones – microphones for stage and studio application, microphones for vocals and instruments, microphones for film and broadcasting, presentation, accessories
 Conference Systems and Technology – voting systems, tour guide systems, installed sound and wireless microphones, tele and video conferencing, headphones and headsets for broadcast, commentators and interpreters, multimedia systems, conference and recording software, mixers, amplifiers and accessories

See also
List of microphone manufacturers

References

External links

Official Website
beyerdynamic UK
beyerdynamic USA
beyerdynamic Iran
beyerdynamic Australia
beyerdynamic India
beyerdynamic New Zealand
Bluetooth Earphones Review

Headphones manufacturers
Microphone manufacturers
Electronics companies established in 1924
German brands
Manufacturers of professional audio equipment
Companies based in Baden-Württemberg
Companies based in Heilbronn
Headphone amplifier manufacturers
1924 establishments in Germany
Audio equipment manufacturers of Germany